Bill Thomas (born 1952) is an English stage and screen actor.

Career
He was Tom Henshall in the BBC series Cutting It and Charles Quance in the classic BBC serial The House of Eliott, had the lead role the feature film Weak at Denise and Syrup (which was nominated for an Academy Award for best short life action feature in 1994). A recent return to the stage saw him playing Ironside, in An English Tragedy, a new play by Oscar-winning playwright Ronald Harwood. A generation of young adults know him as Mr Tucknott the pompous and long suffering bank manager in the classic Bodger and Badger series on BBCTV.

His previous stage work includes the lead role in Dragon in the Olivier Theatre as a member of the Royal National Theatre, a remarkable and innovative production by the accomplished director Ulz, after working together at Nottingham Playhouse. He was Arturo UI in The Resistible Rise of Arturo Ui, directed by David Gilmore at the Nuffield Theatre, Southampton and went on to lead roles in repertory for much his early career, having five children in the process with his wife, whom he met at the Victoria Theatre, Stoke in his first job out of Rose Bruford College. He was 23 and she was in the sixth form at a local school and worked as a volunteer usherette.

He has also had sculpture exhibited at the Whitechapel Gallery in East London, where he has lived for most of his life. He has a long connection with the Theatre Royal, Stratford, E15, where with Jeff Teare and Patrick Prior he pioneered a series of political dramas, developing and performing leading roles in satirical attacks on Margaret Thatchers government. The same team produced pantomimes for many years during the 1980s and 90's which set a standard in British Theatre for integrity and quality.

His recent TV work has included spells in Emmerdale and Doctors, Heartbeat and two films with director Norman Hull based on true life events that revolve around the crimes of unlikely individuals, The Canoe Man and the Antiques Rogueshow, and has completed filming on Abrahams Point with Mackenzie Crook and Harriet Walter.

Selected film and television work

In 2017 Thomas played Dr. Mazery in Loving Vincent.

Appearances in theatre
 Played Ironside the prison Warder in a new play by Oscar-winning writer Ronald Harwood AN ENGLISH TRAGEDY - Watford Palace Theatre.
 Burgomeister (lead) in DRAGON in the Olivier - Royal National Theatre 
 Arturo Ui in THE RESISTIBLE RISE OF ARTURO UI - Nuffield Theatre, Southampton

External links

 Bill Thomas home page
 
 Spotlight
 Personal Management

Living people
1952 births
English male television actors
English male film actors
English male stage actors